Jodha Gurung (born 14 July 1954) is a Nepalese middle-distance runner. He competed in the men's 800 metres at the 1984 Summer Olympics.

References

External links
 

1954 births
Living people
Athletes (track and field) at the 1984 Summer Olympics
Nepalese male middle-distance runners
Olympic athletes of Nepal
Place of birth missing (living people)
20th-century Nepalese people